Lado a Lado is the soundtrack album from the 2012 Brazilian telenovela of the same name, produced by Mariozinho Rocha, and released on November 29, 2012, by Som Livre.

In February 2013, Som Livre released a second soundtrack album, containing the instrumental soundtrack of the telenovela, entitled Lado a Lado - Música Original de Roger Henri (English: "Lado a Lado - Original Music by Roger Henri"). All songs were written and composed by Roger Henri.

The telenovela's soundtrack innovated by blending traditional genres, such as samba and MPB, with modern styles, like rap and electronic music.

Artwork
The cover sleeve of the album depicts the telenovela's main actors Thiago Fragoso, Marjorie Estiano, Camila Pitanga and Lázaro Ramos, dressed as their respective characters. The cover sleeve of the instrumental album depicts the telenovela's logo.

Track listing

Notes
Lado a Lado - Música Original de Roger Henri: All songs were written and composed by Roger Henri.

References

See also 
 Lado a Lado
 List of Lado a Lado characters

Television soundtracks